Vincenzo Filonardi (23 June 1853 – 17 May 1916) was an Italian politician and soldier of the Regio Esercito, who was the first governor of Italian Somalia. In 1890, he was also consul of the Kingdom of Italy to Zanzibar.

Life

In 1870 Vincenzo Filonardi  was graduated as "navy captain" in Genova.

Later, as Captain Vincenzo Filonardi, he had under his command several ships between Italy and 
the coasts of Eastern Africa. In the 1880s he was able to create a successful shipping company between Italy and the Indian Ocean.

In 1890 Filonardi had been nominated by the Italian Prime Minister Giovanni Giolitti consul and ambassador of Italy at Zanzibar.

From 3 August 1889 to 15 May 1893 Filonardi was the first Governor of Italian Somaliland and was in charge of an Italian company responsible for the administration of the Benadir territory, called Societa' Filonardi.
 

 
After 3 years of "interim" in 1896, he was named again governor of the Somalia italiana for two years more. He returned to Italy after his "Societa' Filonardi" was closed and was created the Societa' Benadir, from which was later politically created the Somalia Italiana in 1905.
 
Filonardi moved to live in Rome in 1913, meanwhile he wrote books (like "Considerazioni sulla Somalia Italiana" and "Poche osservazioni sul mercato di Zanzibar e sull'opportunità di crearvi un consolato italiano") until his death in 1916.

References

Bibliography
L. De Courten. L'amministrazione coloniale italiana del Benadir. Dalle compagnie commerciali alla gestione statale (1889-1914), in "Storia contemporanea, IX". Roma, 1978

See also

List of colonial governors of Italian Somaliland
Somalia Italiana
Benadir

Ambassadors of Italy to Zanzibar
Governors of Italian Somaliland
Italian politicians
1853 births
1916 deaths